Hrabyně is a municipality and village in Opava District in the Moravian-Silesian Region of the Czech Republic. It has about 1,100 inhabitants.

Administrative parts
The village of Josefovice is an administrative part of Hrabyně.

Geography
It is located in the Nízký Jeseník mountain range.

History
The first written mention of Hrabyně is from 1377, when it was a part of the Duchy of Troppau.

Economy
Hrabyně is known for the Rehabilitation Institute Hrabyně, which was founded in the 1950s. It deals with the treatment of patients with musculoskeletal and nervous system disorders.

Notable people
Karel Engliš (1880–1961), economist, political scientist and politician

References

External links

Villages in Opava District